Take 21, previously  Toronto Student Film Festival or TSFF, is an annual event for youth to showcase their talent in a variety of short film genres. Take 21 has attracted film makers from several countries. Prizes have focused on work experiences in the industry, scholarships to film making programmes, money, and film equipment.

History
In the fall of 2005, three grade twelve students from Crescent School in Toronto, Ontario, approached their teacher, Jamie MacRae, with the idea of creating a new student film festival specifically designed to showcase youth talent, and creativity. The festival would provide an opportunity for students from any part of the world to screen their media works and short films. The TSFF Founding Committee was made up of  these three Crescent School students – Zack Russell, Gordon Steiner, and David Whyte, Jamie MacRae (Head of Media Arts, Crescent School, Colin Lowndes Head of Crescent’s Upper [High] School, and entertainment executive Pat Macdonald.

Past Finalists

2014 Finalists

2013 Finalists

2012 Finalists

2011 Finalists

Past Judges

2014
Sarah Goodman
Maxine Bailey
Kass Banning

2013
Ron Mann
Susan Coyne
Richard Crouse

2012
Jesse Wente
Martha Burns
Ron Mann

2011
Sarah Polley
Jane Tattersal
Yonah Lewis and Calvin Thomas

2010
Niv Fichman
Deepa Mehta
Paul Gross

Past Sponsors

2014

Platinum Sponsors
CBC Documentary Channel
Vistek
Celtx
Royal St. George's College

Gold Sponsors
Independent Producers Studio
Victoria University
Crescent School
Canuck Camera

Silver Sponsors
Balmoral Dental Arts
Raindance Canada
Johnnyland
Max the Mutt
Canada Home Movies
Toronto Youth Shorts Film Festival

2013

Gold Sponsors
Celtx
Vervegirl Magazine
Cineplex
Crescent School
Royal St. George's College
YoungCuts Festival

Silver Sponsors
Crumpler
Max The Mutt
Ste. Anne's Spa
Toronto Home Movies

2012

Gold Sponsors
BMO Nesbitt Burnes
Cineplex
New York Film Academy
Toronto Academy of Acting for Film & Television
Witz Education
Royal St. George's College
Crescent School

Silver Sponsors
Australian Boot Company
Crumpler
Max The Mutt
Picton Picturefest
Rooster Post
Toronto Home Movies

External links
 TSFF Website
 TSFF Facebook Page
 TSFF Twitter Page

References

Short film festivals in Canada
Film festivals in Toronto
Student film festivals